Shabda, is the Sanskrit word for "speech sound". In Sanskrit grammar, the term refers to an utterance in the sense of linguistic performance.

History

In classical Indian philosophy of language, the grammarian Katyayana stated that shabda ("speech") is eternal (nitya), as is artha "meaning", and that they share a mutual co-relation.

Om, or Aum, a sacred syllable of Hinduism, Buddhism, Jainism and Sikhism, is considered to be the first resonating vibrational sound within an individual being. It also denotes the non-dualistic universe as a whole. In Buddhism, Om corresponds to the crown chakra and white light.

Bhartrihari, on the other hand, held a shabda-advaita position, identifying shabda as indivisible, and unifying the notions of cognition and linguistic performance, which is ultimately identical to Brahman. Bhartrhari recognised two entities, both of which may be referred to as shabda. One entity is the underlying cause of the articulated sounds, while the other entity is the functionality that is used to express meaning. Bhartrhari thus rejected the difference posited between the ontological and the linguistic by logicians. His concept of shabda-brahman which identified linguistic performance and creation itself ran parallel to the Greek concept of logos.

Language philosophy in Medieval India was dominated by the dispute of the "naturalists" to the Mimamsa school, notably defended by Kumarila, who held that shabda designates the actual phonetic utterance, and the Sphota school, defended by Mandana Mishra, which identifies sphota and shabda as a mystical "indivisible word-whole".

In religion

Hinduism

Śabda (शब्द) means relying on word, testimony of past or present reliable experts, specifically the shruti, Vedas. Hiriyanna explains Sabda-pramana as a concept which means reliable expert testimony. The schools of Hinduism which consider it epistemically valid suggest that a human being needs to know numerous facts, and with the limited time and energy available, he can learn only a fraction of those facts and truths directly.  He must rely on others, his parent, family, friends, teachers, ancestors and kindred members of society to rapidly acquire and share knowledge and thereby enrich each other's lives. This means of gaining proper knowledge is either spoken or written, but through Sabda (words). The reliability of the source is important, and legitimate knowledge can only come from the Sabda of reliable sources. The disagreement between the schools of Hinduism has been on how to establish reliability. Some schools, such as Carvaka, state that this is never possible, and therefore Sabda is not a proper pramana. Other schools debate means to establish reliability.

Sikhism
In Sikhism the term Shabad (Gurmukhi: ਸਬਦ) has two primary meanings. 

The first context of the term is to refer to a hymn or paragraph or sections of the Holy Text that appears in Guru Granth Sahib, the main holy scripture of the Sikhs. The Guru Granth Sahib is organised by chapters of ragas, with each chapter containing many shabads of that raga. The first Shabad in Guru Granth Sahib is the Mool Mantar. The script used for the Shabad is Gurmukhi. Shabad is the term also used to refer to hymns within other Sikh scriptures, like Deh Siva Var Mohe. Shabad Vani is devotional singing of hymns from Sikh scriptures. 

The second use of the term Shabad in Sikhism is for the holy name of God, Waheguru.

Other faiths and philosophies
Esoterically, Shabd is the “Sound Current vibrating in all creation. It can be heard by the inner ears.” Variously referred to as the Audible Life Stream, Inner Sound, Sound Current or Word in English, the Shabd is the esoteric essence of God which is available to all human beings, according to the Shabd path teachings of Sant Mat, Surat Shabd Yoga, Eckankar, Vardankar (a split-off from Eckankar), and Movement of Spiritual Inner Awareness.

See also
 Contemporary Sant Mat movements
 Mantra
 Nada yoga
 Religious text

References

Sources

Patnaik, Tandra, Śabda : a study of Bhartrhari’s philosophy of language, New Delhi : DK Printworld, 1994, .
Singh, Kirpal (1949). A Great Saint, Baba Jaimal Singh. Ruhani Satsang Books, p. 7-9.

External links

 
Communication theory
Esoteric schools of thought
Language and mysticism
Philosophy of language
Sant Mat
Vyakarana
Hymns